Dioryctria juniperella is a species of snout moth in the genus Dioryctria. It was described by Hiroshi Yamanaka in 1990. It is found in Korea and Japan.

The wingspan is 19–20 mm. The ground colour of the forewings is blackish fuscous mixed with brownish fuscous.

The larvae feed on Juniperus species, including Juniperus chinensis and Juniperus procumbens. They tie the leaves of their host plant and feed from within. The larvae are dark green with a yellowish brown head. They reach a length of 7–9 mm.

References

Moths described in 1990
juniperella
Moths of Japan